Wolfgang Siegfried Karg (1927–2016) was an East German entomologist who specialised in mites (Acari).  

Following captivity in World War II he completed high school and teacher training, and then taught in high schools from 1948 to 1950 in Groß-Alsleben, Sachsen-Anhalt, in what was then  East Germany. 

He received his doctorate in 1960 from Humboldt University in Berlin and completed his habilitation in 1965 with a thesis on phylogeny of predatory mites.

From 1956 he worked at the Biological Research Centre in Berlin. In 1990 he was appointed professor. 

He worked on the effect of pesticides on microarthropods in various ecosystems;  predatoy mites in agronomy; and the systematics and phylogeny of Mesostigmata, and was awarded the Fabricius medal in 1993 by the Deutsche Gesellschaft für Allgemeine und Angewandte Entomologie (German entomology society).

Species

Species named and described by Karg 
Over 800 taxa were named and described by Karg. See also Taxa named by Wolfgang Karg.

Species named to honour Karg 

 Alliphis kargi Arutunian, 1991
 Cheiroseius kargi Gwiazdowicz, 2002
 Cyrthydrolaelaps kargi Hirschmann, 1966
 Dendrolaelaps kargi Hirschmann, 1966
 Epicrius kargi Solomon, 1978
 Evimirus kargi Hirschmann, 1975
 Hypoaspis kargi Costa, 1968
 Iphidozercon kargi Hirschmann, 1966
 Lasioseius kargi Kandil, 1980
 Lasioseius kargi Christian, 1990
 Thinoseius kargi Hirschmann, 1966
 Uropoda kargi Hirschmann & Zirngiebl-Nicol, 1969

Some publications

References 

1927 births
2016 deaths
German entomologists
Humboldt University of Berlin alumni